Men in Black: The Series (also known as MIB: The Series, MIB: The Animated Series, and Men in Black: The Animated Series) is an American animated television series that originally aired on Kids' WB from October 11, 1997 to June 30, 2001.

The show features characters from the 1997 science fiction film Men in Black, which was based on the comic book series The Men in Black by Lowell Cunningham, originally published by Marvel / Malibu Comics. The series was produced by Adelaide Productions, a division of Columbia TriStar Television, and Amblin Entertainment as a half-hour series originally airing on Saturday mornings, and later moving to weekdays during its final run.

Plot
The show is set in an alternate timeline to the Men in Black film universe. The most significant differences in the series are that Agent K did not retire, and Agent J is still regarded as a rookie. Agent L on the other hand is depicted as a senior staff of the organization, a radical change from the first film. Some episodes do incorporate aspects of the film franchise. While the series offers internal continuity and extended plot arcs, it is primarily presented in standalone episodes. Some recurring themes include the exploration of K's origins, as well as J encountering individuals from his life prior to joining MIB. Unlike the film series, the MIB headquarters is located at what looks like a disused area under LaGuardia airport instead of 504 Battery Drive in New York City.

Episodes

Characters

Characters design
The aesthetics of the characters were designed by comic book artist Miguelanxo Prado.

Voice cast

Main
 Ed O'Ross
 Gregg Berger
 Keith Diamond
 Jennifer Lien
 Jennifer Martin
 Charles Napier
 Vincent D'Onofrio
 David Warner

Additional voices
Charlie Adler
Carlos Alazraqui
Thomas Deeken
Sherman Howard
Kath Soucie
Billy West

Home media
In the United States, six episodes from the first half of the first season were issued on three two-episode VHS volumes, all made available on March 16, 1999. The United Kingdom received a similar release on August 19, 2002, however, all six episodes were released on one bumper VHS instead of three two-episode volumes. The release also included a bonus seventh episode, which was actually episode one, billed as the "pilot episode". It was then announced that the remainder of the show's first season, episodes 8–13, would be exclusively released in the region, being made available on VHS on January 24, 2003. On July 12, 2004, the first three episodes of the first season were issued on DVD for the first time by UCA Pictures. Further releases were planned, but sales were not strong enough to warrant any other DVD releases from UCA. The entire first season was issued on DVD for the first time on July 4, 2007 in Australia, via Sony Pictures Entertainment. The set contained two discs, one containing seven episodes and the other containing the remaining six. On July 16, 2007, the set was made available in the United Kingdom, however, was this time split up into two separate volumes instead of a whole box set. On May 11, 2012, the entire first season was released on DVD for the first time in the United States, being made available as an exclusive product for Target stores in the country. Thus far, no plans have been announced to issue any further seasons of the show on DVD as of 2021. The series is available on the streaming service Sony Crackle, alternating between the first two seasons and the last two.

Awards
Daytime Emmy Awards
 2002  – Outstanding Sound Editing – Special Class – Roshaun Hawley, Paca Thomas, Dan Cubert and Marc S. Perlman (won)

Video games
A video game based on the series, titled Men in Black: The Series, was released for the Game Boy Color in 1999. A sequel, titled Men in Black 2: The Series and also based on the show, was released for the Game Boy Color in 2000. A different version of Men in Black: The Series was released for the Game Boy Advance in 2001. Another game based on the series, titled Men in Black: The Series – Crashdown, was released for the PlayStation later in 2001.

References

External links

 Official Website (via Internet Archive)
 

1990s American animated television series
1990s American black cartoons
1990s American comic science fiction television series
1990s American workplace comedy television series
1997 American television series debuts
2000s American animated television series
2000s American black cartoons
2000s American comic science fiction television series
2000s American workplace comedy television series
2001 American television series endings
Alternative sequel television series
American children's animated action television series
American children's animated adventure television series
American children's animated comic science fiction television series
[Category:Animated television series about extraterrestrial life]
Animated television shows based on films
Animated television series based on Marvel Comics
English-language television shows
Kids' WB original shows
Men in Black (franchise)
Television series about the Central Intelligence Agency
Television series about the Federal Bureau of Investigation
Television series based on adaptations
Television series by Adelaide Productions
Television series by Amblin Entertainment
Television series by Sony Pictures Television
Television shows adapted into video games
Television shows set in New York City
The WB original programming